Patrick James Mulvany (2 July 1871 – 16 May 1951) was an Irish politician and farmer. He was first elected to Dáil Éireann at the 1923 general election as a Farmers' Party Teachta Dála (TD) for the Meath constituency. He did not contest the June 1927 general election.

References

1871 births
1951 deaths
Farmers' Party (Ireland) TDs
Irish farmers
Members of the 4th Dáil
Politicians from County Meath